Feldkirchen bei Graz is a municipality in the district of Graz-Umgebung in the Austrian state of Styria.

History
It is the site of the mass grave of prisoners interned, tortured and killed by the Austro-Hungarian Empire at the nearby  Thalerhof internment camp, now the site of the Graz Airport.

Population

References

Cities and towns in Graz-Umgebung District